Kentucky Route 207 (KY 207) is a  state highway in the U.S. state of Kentucky. The highway connects mostly rural areas of Carter and Greenup counties with Argillite and Flatwoods.

Route description
KY 207 begins at an intersection with KY 1654 (Williams Creek Road) west-southwest of Rush, within Carter County. It travels to the west-northwest and passes O'Neal Cemetery before curving to the north-northwest. The highway has a very brief concurrency with U.S. Route 60 (US 60). When the two highways split, KY 207 travels to the north-northeast. Then, it passes Sally Cemetery. The highway then travels to the north-northwest. It has two crossings of Cane Creek before it crosses over Interstate 64 (I-64). It heads to the north and crosses Cane Creek again. It enters Greenup County and then curves to the north-northeast. The highway crosses over Logtown Hollow before curving to the north-northwest. It crosses Cane Creek for a third time and curves to the north to a crossing of Caudle Branch. Then, it crosses over McCall Hollow and curves to the north-northeast. KY 207 crosses over Tunnel Branch before intersecting the eastern terminus of KY 3306 (Tunnel Branch Road) in Hunnewell. The highway crosses over Cane Creek one final time and then curves to the north-northwest. It crosses over Sawmill Branch. Then, the highway curves to the northeast and crosses Sandsuck Creek. The highway then enters Argillite, where it begins a concurrency with KY 1. The two highways pass a U.S. Post Office and curve to the northeast. They cross the East Fork Little Sandy River before they split. KY 207 heads in a fairly east-southeast direction. It has an interchange with KY 67 (Industrial Parkway). The highway curves to the east-northeast, crosses Old Stream Branch, and intersects KY 503 (Uhlens Branch Road). The two highways travel concurrently to the southeast for a short distance. When they split, KY 207 resumes its east-northeast direction and enters Flatwoods. At Bellefonte Road, it has a very brief concurrency with KY 693. In the main part of Flatwoods, the highway intersects KY 750 (Lexington Avenue/Powell Lane). In the far northeastern part of the city, it meets its northern terminus, an intersection with US 23. Here, the roadway continues as an unnamed local road.

Major intersections

See also

References

0207
Transportation in Carter County, Kentucky
Transportation in Greenup County, Kentucky